Rafael Albuquerque may refer to:
Rafael Albuquerque (artist) (born 1981), Brazilian comic artist

See also 
Rafael Alburquerque (born 1940), 38th Vice President of the Dominican Republic